Pierrefiche is the name of two communes in France:

 Pierrefiche, in the Aveyron département
 Pierrefiche, in the Lozère département